Daniel John Doran (born 18 June 1981 in Hobart, Tasmania) is an Australian cricketer who played for Queensland in Australian domestic cricket. He was a right-arm leg break bowler.

In grade cricket Doran plays for Gold Coast, and Gold Coast coach Ross Wallace described him as the best leg spinner he had ever seen and a "very good Captain who displayed leadership skills beyond the Grade Cricket level." He made his first-class debut in 2005–06 against Western Australia and took five wickets. Despite starting the season without a rookie contract, he ended it with a Pura Cup trophy and a place at the Academy. He got 3 wickets in the batting dominated final, including the vital wicket of David Hussey with his first ball of the second innings. His figures for the summer were 15 wickets at 28.46.

References

External links
Player profile from cricinfo

1981 births
Living people
Australian cricketers
Queensland cricketers
Cricketers from Hobart